Elections were held in the Australian state of Queensland between 27 April 1860 to 11 May 1860 to elect the members of the state's Legislative Assembly.

Key dates
Due to problems of distance and communications, it was not possible to hold the elections on a single day.

See also
 Members of the Queensland Legislative Assembly, 1860–1863

References

Elections in Queensland
1860 elections in Australia
April 1860 events
May 1860 events
1860s in Queensland